Chiara is a 2022 biographical historical musical drama film written and directed by Susanna Nicchiarelli. It follows the life of Saint Clare of Assisi, played by Margherita Mazzucco. It premiered in competition at the 79th Venice International Film Festival on 9 September 2022.

Cast
 Margherita Mazzucco as Chiara
 Andrea Carpenzano as Francesco
 Carlotta Natoli as Cristiana
 Paola Tiziana Cruciani as Balvina
 Flaminia Mancin as Pacifica
 Valentino Campitelli as Elia
 Paolo Briguglia as Leone
 Giulia Testi as Cecilia
 Luigi Vestuto as Pacifico
 Luigi Lo Cascio as Cardinal Ugolino, later Pope Gregory IX

Production
Nicchiarelli conceived of the film during the early COVID-19 lockdowns in Italy after reading a book on Clare by historian Chiara Frugoni, who served as the script consultant for the film. According to Nicchiarelli, the dialogue is in "the Umbrian vernacular of the time". Linguist Nadia Cannata provided assistance for adapting the dialogue from modern Italian. Nicchiarelli took inspirations for the musical numbers from films such as Hair and Jesus Christ Superstar.

Reception
Nicholas Bell of IONCINEMA gave the film one out of five stars, writing, "While the subject matter lends itself to a necessary rigidity, Nicchiarelli only accomplishes in conveying a sense of the interminable in this ponderous exercise, attempting to enliven the production with musical numbers both distracting and cringeworthy." Sheri Linden of The Hollywood Reporter described the film as an "earnest yet playful take on Clare", adding, "Chiara wanders, in ways that can be rewarding or confounding, but it takes chances." Davide Abbatescianni of Cineuropa praised in particular Margherita Mazzucco as she "stands out in the cast on account of her seraphic and courageous portrayal of a girl and a woman who refuses to bend to her family’s violence or the pressure exerted by Cardinal Ugolini."

References

External links
 

2022 biographical drama films
2020s historical drama films
2020s musical drama films
Italian biographical drama films
Italian historical drama films
Italian musical drama films
Belgian biographical drama films
Belgian historical drama films
Belgian musical drama films
2020s Italian-language films
Films about Catholicism
Films set in the 13th century
Films set in Umbria
Films directed by Susanna Nicchiarelli
Cultural depictions of Italian women
2020s Italian films